Yeykell Eliuth Romero  (born 16 November 2002) is a Nicaraguan Olympic athlete and national record holder. 

In 2021 he broke a 35-year-old national record in the 100 metres running a time of 10.65. The previous record of 10.70 was set in 1986 by Roberto Guillen. In June 2021 he ran 10.50 at the Central American Championships to break the record again. At the Athletics at the 2020 Summer Olympics – Men's 100 metres he ran 10.62 to qualify from the preliminary heats.

Personal life
He studied Industrial Engineering at the National Autonomous University of Nicaragua. As a youngster he was a member of the Nicaragua youth national team in baseball and initially began training in athletics to help improve his performance in baseball.

References

2002 births
Living people
Nicaraguan male sprinters
Olympic athletes of Nicaragua
Olympic male sprinters
Athletes (track and field) at the 2020 Summer Olympics